Temelín Nuclear Power Station (abbreviation JETE) is a nuclear power plant in Temelín in the Czech Republic. Temelín NPP is owned by ČEZ Group, which employs 1000 workers at this site. The adjacent castle Vysoký Hrádek serves as an information centre.

In spring 2003, the Temelín Nuclear Power Plant, with its 2,000 MW of installed capacity, became the largest power resource in the Czech Republic.

History

Planning began in the late 1970s and the final project was submitted in 1985. Construction of four operating units began in 1987. The project was expected to be completed in 1991 with estimated building costs of 35 billion CSK. Six villages were demolished by the then-Communist government to make way for the power station.

After the Velvet revolution in 1990 the Czechoslovakian government decided to cease construction of the third and fourth reactors. Work continued on the first two reactors; in the 1990s alterations to the original design were made by Westinghouse in conjunction with SUJB and the IAEA to bring reliability and safety levels into conformance with Western European standards. The standards audit was carried out by Halliburton NUS. As part of the alterations information and control systems were added, electrical modifications carried out, and cabling, reactor core and fuel elements were replaced. In 1993 the Czech government decided to complete the plant in the face of delays and cost overruns, with expected completion at the time estimated for 1997. In 1994 an opinion poll reported that 68% of Czech citizens were in favor of nuclear power development.

In 1998 construction still was not completed and costs reached 71 CZK billion. The Czech government again reconsidered completion of the plant. In 1999 the decision was made to continue, hoping for an expected completion in 2000 with a maximum cost of 98.6 CZK billion. The project was controversial; national and international (mainly Austrian) opposition was stronger than in the early 1990s. In a 1999 opinion poll 47% of Czech citizens were in favor and 53% against nuclear power development, a fall from 1994. In subsequent years the same poll showed change to 63% in favor and 37% against in 2000 with 58% in favor and 42% against in 2001, indicating fluctuation of opinion. 
 
As early as 1993 there were local and international protests against the plant's construction. Large grassroots civil disobedience actions took place in 1996 and 1997. These were organized by the so-called Clean Energy Brigades. In September and October 2000, Austrian anti-nuclear protesters demonstrated against the Temelín Nuclear Power Plant and at one stage temporarily blocked all 26 border crossings between Austria and the Czech Republic.

Melk Protocol
The Melk Protocol is the protocol of negotiations between the Czech and Austrian Governments, led by Czech Prime Minister Miloš Zeman and Austrian Chancellor Wolfgang Schüssel, with the participation of European Commissioner Günter Verheugen. It was signed on 12 December 2000 in Melk, Lower Austria.

The aim of the protocol was to resolve the disputes over the Czech nuclear power plant Temelín, whose construction Austria fundamentally opposed. The Czech Republic committed itself to some above-standard procedures (e.g., notification of events at Temelín to Austria, a more stringent environmental impact assessment). Consequently, Austria recognised the importance of EU enlargement and agreed that the free movement of goods and people must be preserved (this clause was a response to the blockade of Czech-Austrian border crossings by Austrian anti-nuclear activists). The protocol is not legally binding.

The first reactor was finally commissioned in 2000 and the second in 2002.

Technical data

Most information was taken from ČEZ website Others from leaflet "Energy from South Bohemia" by ČEZ Group and the IAEA PRIS database. In 2013 the reactors were updated from 3,000 MW thermal output to 3,120 MW output, bringing the total output to 1003 MWe net and 1056 MWe gross. In 2015 turbomachinery was updated, bringing the total output to the current 1026 MWe net and 1080 MWe gross.

The reactor vessel (active zone) 
 The reactor contains 163 fuel assemblies. 
 A single assembly has the shape of ~4.5m long hexagonal and inside are 312 fuel rods and 61 control rods.
 The fuel rods contain stacked cylindrical fuel pellets. 
 Fuel enrichment: max. 4% (average 3.5%) of 235U (fissile isotope).
 Fuel load UO2: 92t (The reactor splits about 3 kg of uranium every day).
 Fuel Replacement cycle: 4 years (1/4 is changed yearly).
 Vessel height: ~11m, outside diameter: ~4.5m, wall thickness: 193 mm.
 The vessel is designed for up to 17.6MPa at 350 °C.
 The vessel is made of high quality, low-alloy chrome-nickel-molybdenum-vanadium steel.
 For the reactor to produce 1W of thermal output, 30 billion fissions of uranium-235 must take place every second. For a coal power station to produce the same output 1,500,000,000 billion carbon atoms must be burned.

Reactor cooling system 
 Number of cooling loops: 4
 Quantity of primary circuit coolant: 337 m3
 Operating pressure: 15.7MPa 
 Coolant inlet temperature: approx. 290 °C (554F)
 Coolant outlet temperature: approx. 320 °C (608F)
 Coolant flow through reactor: 23.5 m3/s

Steam generator 
 Number per reactor block: 4
 Steam delivered per one generator: 1470 t/hour
 Steam outlet pressure: 6.3MPa
 Steam outlet temperature: 278.5 °C (533.3F)

Cooling circuit 
 The plant has 4 cooling towers (each reactor has 2 towers).
 Pure water is evaporated in cooling tower (~0.3m3/s). 
 The water needs to be constantly refilled.

Protective Envelope (containment) 
 Height of cylindrical section: 38m
 Inside diameter of cylindrical section: 45m
 Wall thickness: 1.2m
 Thickness of steel lining: 8mm

Turbine generator set 
 Number per production block: 1
 Number of steam turbine sections: 1 high pressure and 3 low pressure
 Speed: 3000 rpm
 Voltage on alternator's terminal: 24kV
 Alternator cooling: hydrogen – water

Reliability
The International Atomic Energy Agency data show that Reactor 1 reaches a cumulative operating factor of about 63%, and Reactor 2 an operating factor of about 76%. The cumulative operating factor figures for Temelín NPP reactors are lower than the figures of similar reactors operated in Russia, where the cumulative operating factor is around 80-87%.

ČEZ had increased operating factor and production in recent years and the plant reached 84% in 2012 with a total record production of 15 TWh.

New reactors
Plans to build all four original reactors were reopened in 2005.  However, in 2014 the prospective plans were cancelled.

In 2007 planning was suspended because a new government agreed not to promote nuclear energy; a Green Party was a member of the coalition government. However, in July 2008 ČEZ requested the Ministry of the Environment conduct an environmental impact assessment for two additional reactors. In 2009 regional approval was granted for the new build. 
In August 2009, ČEZ sought bids for two pressurized water reactors (PWRs). 
Shortly after the Fukushima nuclear accidents, Prime Minister Petr Nečas announced that the construction of new reactors will continue according to the original plans, but with the tender selection delayed to 2013.

In July 2012 ČEZ opened bids for the public contract for completing the Temelín Nuclear Power Plant in the presence of the bidders - Areva, a consortium of the Westinghouse Electric Company, LLC and WESTINGHOUSE ELECTRIC ČR, and a consortium of ŠKODA JS, Atomstroyexport, and Gidropress.
In October 2012 ČEZ informed Areva that they have in their bid failed to meet statutory requirements. Moreover, Areva has not fulfilled some other crucial criteria defined in the tender. Since the award procedure has been conducted in accordance with the Public Procurement Act, Areva's bid had to be excluded from further evaluation.

In March 2013, a Russian led consortium, comprising Atomstroyexport, Gidropress and Skoda, signed contracts with the three Czech companies ZAT, HOCHTIEF CZ and UJV Rez, for the construction of the two new nuclear reactor units for Temelín-3 and Temelín-4. The reactors proposed are the MIR-1200 (Modernised International Reactor).
ZAT would supply automated systems for the plant, HOCHTIEF CZ would be responsible for construction of the nuclear island, and UJV Rez would help compile project documentation for the nuclear and turbine islands, and also create working documentation for construction of the plant. A statement said the consortium is aiming for a "localisation level" of 75 percent.
The other running project for the contract was Westinghouse with its AP1000 reactor. The winner of the contract was scheduled to be announced at the end of 2013.

In April 2014, ČEZ cancelled the project after the Czech government stated it does not plan to provide guarantees or other mechanisms to support the construction of low-emission power plants following discussions in the EU. The ČEZ CEO stated:

In 2021, Westinghouse was contracted to upgrade the instrumentation and control (I&C) systems in a 9-year project.

See also

 Nuclear power in the Czech Republic
 Energy in the Czech Republic
 Dukovany Nuclear Power Station – another nuclear power plant in the Czech Republic

References

External links

 Official info on website of ČEZ
 360 Panorama of Temelin Nuclear Power Plant
 10 Years of Experience with Westinghouse Fuel at NPP Temelin

Nuclear power stations in the Czech Republic
České Budějovice District
Nuclear power stations using VVER reactors
Buildings and structures in the South Bohemian Region
Energy infrastructure completed in 2000
2000 establishments in the Czech Republic
21st-century architecture in the Czech Republic